Liotina fijiensis, common name the Pacific liotia, is a species of small sea snail, a marine gastropod mollusk, in the family Liotiidae.

Distribution
This species occurs in the Pacific Ocean off Fiji.

References

External links
 To World Register of Marine Species

fijiensis
Gastropods described in 1934